Sri Rajadhi Rajasinha (Sinhala:ශ්‍රී රාජාධි රාජසිංහ, Tamil:ஸ்ரீ ராஜாதி ராஜசிங்கம்; reigned 1782–1798) was  a member of the Madurai royal family and succeeded his brother, Kirti Sri Rajasinha as King of Kandy in 1782.

Early life
Sri Rajashi Rajasinghe was the second son of Lord Narendrappa Nayakkar of Madurai Nayakkar clan. He succeeded his elder brother King Keerthi Sri Rajasinghe on 2 January 1782.

Marriages

He had five Nayakkar wives. His Queen Consort was Alamelu Ammal Devi. His third wife, Rangammal Devi, who was a younger sister of Queen Consort. His second wife was Upendra Ammal Devi who was arrived from Rameshwaram, South India. He appointed Siriyammal Devi as Royal Concubine his fourth wife, who was another younger sister of Queen Consort. And also he had mistresses, couple of them were more popular. He kept his elder brother Keerthi Sri Rajasinghe's Royal Councubine Mampitiye Devi as a mistress, so she interference to the royal court during last three rulers' reigns. Lady Subbramma Nayak, who was a younger sister of second consort Upendra Ammal Devi became Rajadhi Rajasinghe's mistress after her husband died. Later she became the mother of Sri Wickrama Rajasinghe, who was the last king of Kandy.

But any of his five Nayakkar wives had not any issue.

Reign

Sri Rajadhi Rajasinghe was ruled the Kandyan Kingdom more than 16 years. During his reign he could maintain a peaceful affair with Dutch army. The most famous joker Andare was served to him. Like his brother he had done a great contribution to the Buddhism and Literature during his reign.

Succession

Base on the Nayakkar tradition, he was named Prince Muttusami as the heir apparent, who was younger brother of Queen Consort Alamelu Ammal and offered him the rank, "Duke the Great" . But after his unexpected death by falling down from Royal elephant, his mistress Lady Subbramma Nayak's son (known as Rajadhi Rajasinghe's illegitimate son) was crowned as new king.

See also
 Mahavamsa
 List of monarchs of Sri Lanka
 History of Sri Lanka

Sources
 Kings & Rulers of Sri Lanka

1798 deaths
Monarchs of Kandy
Year of birth unknown
Rajasinha
Rajasinha
S